Xi'an Aircraft Industrial Corporation, also known as Xi'an Aircraft Company Limited (XAC), is a Chinese aircraft manufacturer and developer of large and medium-sized airplanes. It is based in Yanliang District, Xi'an, Shaanxi Province, adjacent to Xi'an Yanliang Airport. It is joint partners with No. 603 Aircraft Design Institute of military aircraft. XAC was established in 1958 and has more than 20,000 employees.

Its key clients include the People's Liberation Army Naval Air Force and People's Liberation Army Air Force. Currently, it is a subsidiary of Aviation Industry Corporation of China (AVIC). One of its own subsidiaries and a listed company is Xi'an Aircraft International Corporation. It is responsible for the production of China's biggest internally manufactured military aircraft, the Xian Y-20.

Products

Turboprops
 Xian MA60 turbo-prop airliner
 Xian MA600 turbo-prop airliner
 Xian MA700 turbo-prop airliner (in development)

Bombers and fighter-bombers
 Xian H-6 twin engine bomber - Chinese-upgraded variant of the Tupolev Tu-16 Badger
 Xian H-8 heavy strategic bomber (cancelled)
 Xian JH-7 Flying Leopard twin engine fighter-bomber. 
 Xian H-20 heavy strategic stealth bomber; under development

Trainers
 Y-7H trainer based on Y-7-100

Parts
 ACAC ARJ21 Xiangfeng -wings and fuselage
Boeing 737 - vertical fins, horizontal stabilizers, forward access doors
Boeing 737NG - vertical fins (30+ year partnership)
Boeing 747 - trailing edge ribs, aluminum and titanium forgings
Boeing 747-8 - 747-8 inboard flaps, the single largest piece of aircraft structure that Boeing purchases from China.
Boeing 787

Transport
 Yun-7 (Y-7) twin-engine turboprop transport 
 Yun-14 (Y-14) twin-engine turboprop transport
 Xian Y-20 four-engine turbofan transport
 Xian KJ-600 AE&C - using Y-7 based Xian JZY-01 as testbed

Partnerships
 Safran Landing Systems

See also

 Xi'an Aero-Engine Corporation
 ACAC consortium
 Aviation Industry Corporation of China
 Changhe Aircraft Industries Corporation
 Chengdu Aircraft Industry Group
 Guizhou Aircraft Industry Co.
 Harbin Aircraft Industry Group
 Hongdu Aviation Industry Corporation
 Shanghai Aviation Industrial Company
 Shaanxi Aircraft Company
 Shenyang Aircraft Corporation

References

External links
 

Aircraft manufacturers of China
Defence companies of the People's Republic of China
Government-owned companies of China
Manufacturing companies based in Xi'an
Manufacturing companies established in 1958
Vehicle manufacturing companies established in 1958
1958 establishments in China
Chinese brands
Yanliang District